Nezool (fl. 5th century) was a king of the Kingdom of Aksum. He is primarily known from the coins minted during his reign, where his name also appears as Nezana.

Munro-Hay reports a theory that Nezool and Nezana were actually the names of a pair of kings who shared in a dual reign. While he presents the possibility, he does not offer another opinion on the subject.

References

Kings of Axum
5th-century monarchs in Africa